The Pyidaungsu Hluttaw (  lit. Assembly of the Union) is the de jure  national-level bicameral legislature of Myanmar (officially known as the Republic of the Union of Myanmar) established by the 2008 National Constitution.  The Pyidaungsu Hluttaw is made up of two houses, the 224-seat Amyotha Hluttaw, or "House of Nationalities", and the 440-seat Pyithu Hluttaw, or House of People's Representatives. There is no mention in the 2008 Constitution of any ‘lower’ or ‘upper’ houses: both the Pyithu Hluttaw and the Amyotha Hluttaw enjoy equal power to initiate, review, amend, and pass legislation.

Each of the fourteen major administrative regions and states has its own local Hluttaw: Region Hluttaw (Region Assembly) or State Hluttaw (State Assembly).

The Pyidaungsu Hluttaw is housed in a 31-building parliamentary complex. It is believed to represent the 31 planes of existence in Buddhist cosmology, located in Zeya Theddhi Ward of Naypyidaw.

Members of the second Pyidaungsu Hluttaw were elected in the 8 November 2015 general election. On 16 March 2012, parliamentarians made the decision for the Pyidaungsu Hluttaw to re-join the IPU.

After the coup d'état on 1 February 2021, the Assembly was dissolved by Acting President Myint Swe, who declared a one-year state of emergency and transferred all legislative powers to Commander-in-Chief of Defence Services Min Aung Hlaing.

History

Pre-colonial era
The hluttaw (lit. "delegation of royal [duties]") historically refers to the council of ministers in the king's court in pre-colonial Burma (Myanmar). Hluttaw's origins trace back to the Pagan era when King Htilominlo (r. 1211–1235) created a privy council of senior ministers to manage the day-to-day affairs of the government.

During the Konbaung dynasty, the hluttaw was the centre of government and the kingdom's national administrative body, divided into three branches, namely fiscal, executive, and judicial (Since the colonial times, hluttaw has been used to describe a parliament or legislative body.) The Byedaik acted as the Privy Council, maintaining the inner affairs of the royal court, whereas the Hluttaw managed the kingdom's government. The Hluttaw, as tradition, also had the duty of selecting the heir-apparent, whenever the incumbent king did not select one.

In the Konbaung dynasty, the Hluttaw was in session for 6 hours daily, from 6 to 9 am, and from noon to 3 pm, attended by ministers (Mingyi), ministers of third rank (Wundauk), and head clerks (Sayegyi), as well as interior ministers (Atwin Wun), who sat in the Byedaik. It was tradition for the king to appoint four ministers, four interior ministers and four officers.

British Burma

On 2 January 1923, with the enactment of the Montagu–Chelmsford Reforms, Burma became a Governor's Province with a partially elected legislative council, the Legislative Council of Burma, consisting of 103 seats, with 80 filled by election.

The 1935 Government of Burma Act established the Legislature of Burma. During this period, the colonial Legislature consisted of two chambers, the 36-seat Senate and the 132-seat House of Representatives.

Union of Burma

From 1947 to 1962, under the 1947 Constitution, Burma's legislature, called the Union Parliament, consisted of two chambers, the 125-seat Lumyozu Hluttaw (the Chamber of Nationalities) and the 250-seat Pyithu Hluttaw; (the Chamber of Deputies), whose seat numbers were determined by the population size of respective constituencies.

Socialist Republic of the Union of Burma

From 1962 to 1974, there was no functional hluttaw in existence, as the ruling government was the socialist Union Revolutionary Council (RC).

From 1974 to 1988, under the 1974 Constitution, Burma's legislative branch was a one-party toy parliament consisting of a unicameral chamber, the Pyithu Hluttaw (the People's Assembly), represented by members of the Burma Socialist Programme Party. Each term was four years. (In August 2010, the old Hluttaw complex on Yangon's Pyay Road used by Gen. Ne Win's military government was slated for occupation by  Yangon Division government offices.)

Union of Myanmar
Between 1988 and 2011, there was no functional hluttaw, as the ruling government was the State Peace and Development Council.

Composition

The Pyidaungsu Hluttaw is a bicameral body made up of a 440-seat House of Representatives (Pyithu Hluttaw) and the 224-seat House of Nationalities (Amyotha Hluttaw). The Pyidaungsu Hluttaw consists of 664 members total. 75% of MPs (498 members) are directly elected by voters, while the remaining 25% (166 members) are military personnel appointed by the Defence Services' Commander-in-Chief. This policy is similar to Indonesia's New Order model (as part of the dwifungsi doctrine), which guaranteed a number of parliamentary seats to military appointees.

Amyotha Hluttaw
The Amyotha Hluttaw is the upper house of the Pyidaungsu Hluttaw, with 12 seats accorded to each Region or State for a total of 168 directly elected seats. Of the 224 seats in the house, the remaining 56 are military appointees nominated by the Commander-in-Chief of the Defence Services.

Pyithu Hluttaw
The Pyithu Hluttaw is the lower house of the Pyidaungsu Hluttaw, with seats accorded to each of the 330 townships in the country. Of the 440 seats in this body, 330 are directly elected and 110 are military appointees nominated by the Commander-in-Chief of the Defence Services.

Elections
Burmese elections are held under universal suffrage for all Burmese citizens above the age of 18 and on a given constituency's roll of eligible voters. Voters are constitutionally guaranteed the right to vote via secret ballot. However, members of religious orders (including members of the Buddhist Sangha), prisoners, mentally unsound persons, and indebted persons are not allowed to vote for members of Parliament. Voting is not compulsory. Burmese elections practise the First-past-the-post voting system (winner takes all), in which the candidate who receives the highest number of votes is elected.

In the 2010 election, state media reported a voter turnout of 77.26%. Advance voting was also widely practised, with military personnel and their family members, as well as civil servants, police force personnel and other state employees instructed to vote in advance. This was in violation of the 2010 electoral laws, which only allow advance voting for eligible voters who are away from their constituencies, as well as overseas Burmese citizens. In some constituencies, up to 95% of cast ballots were done in advance. An estimated 10% of votes (6 million) were cast in advance. There were also reports of multiple voter fraud, voter manipulation, ghost voting and coerced voting, in which individuals were pressured to vote for Union Solidarity and Development Party candidates by officials.

Term

The two houses of the Pyidaungsu Hluttaw are simultaneously elected, with members of parliament (MPs) serving five-year terms. Ministerial nominees, who are selected from the pool of elected MPs, vacate their parliamentary seats. By-elections, determined by the Union Election Commission, are held to elect these vacant seats.

The first regular session of the Pyidaungsu Hluttaw must be convened within 15 days of the commencement of the Pyithu Hluttaw's first session. At least one regular session must be held per year, and subsequent sessions must be held within 12 months of each other. Special or emergency sessions can be convened by the President. Parliamentary sessions are only valid if 25% or more MPs are present.

The first session of the Pyidaungsu Hluttaw was held from January to March 2011, while the second was held from 22 August 2011 to. Journalists were not allowed to attend the first session. However, the Ministry of Information announced on 12 August 2011 that they would be permitted to attend the second session.

See also

 Politics of Myanmar
 List of legislatures by country
 State and Region Hluttaws

References

External links
 Official website of Pyithu Hluttaw

History of Myanmar (1948–present)
Legislatures of Myanmar
Myanmar
Myanmar
Myanmar